George Washington F. Orton (January 10, 1873 – June 24, 1958) was a Canadian middle and long-distance runner. In 1900, he became the first Canadian to win a medal at an Olympic Games. He won a bronze in the 400 metre hurdles, and then, forty-five minutes later, won the gold medal in the 2500 metre steeplechase.  He was the first athlete with a disability to win an Olympic gold medal.  He was also the captain of the University of Pennsylvania track and field team in 1897. He held a Ph.D, spoke nine languages, and was known as "The Father of Philadelphia Hockey".  He won seventeen U.S. National Track and Field titles.

Early life and injury
Orton was born in Strathroy, Ontario, the son of Oliver Henry Orton, a labourer, and his wife, Mary Ann Irvine.  Orton was paralyzed when he fell out of a tree at the age of three.  The fall caused a blood clot on his brain, and severely damaged his right arm.  He was later diagnosed with spinal meningitis.  He could not walk until age ten, but fully regained his mobility around age twelve.

Orton did his undergraduate studies at the University of Toronto, earning a B.A. in 1893 in Romance Languages. He was then offered a scholarship to the University of Pennsylvania in 1893 to complete his Masters (1894) and Ph.D. (1896), at the age of twenty-three.

Running career
By the time he completed his Ph.D., Orton was the top middle-distance runner in the world. He won a then-record seventeen national titles in the United States, along with seven in Canada, and one in the United Kingdom. He won the U.S. one-mile championship six times, the two-mile steeplechase seven times, the Cross Country twice, the five-mile run and the ten-mile run. While a student at the University of Toronto in 1892, Orton set a mile record of 4:21.8 which lasted for forty-two years.  In total, he won 131 races, including a staggering thirty-three National and International championships.

Olympic gold medal
The crowning achievement of Orton's career was the 1900 Summer Olympics, held in Paris.  Orton competed in three official Olympic events: two steeplechase competitions and the 400m hurdles.  He also competed in several other events that were "handicap" races and not recognized by the IOC.  Orton had to give up either time or distance to other runners in these events, because of his success on the track.  He won a bronze medal in the 400m hurdles (the last of which was a water jump).  Just forty-five minutes later, suffering from an intestinal virus, Orton won the gold medal in the 2500m steeplechase, setting a world record of 7:34.4.  The next day, still ill, he placed fifth in the 4000m steeplechase.
 
Unlike today, the early Olympic athletes did not represent their birth country at these competitions.  Nationality was unimportant. They ran as individuals, or members of a university delegation or athletic club.  Including the name of a country alongside a competitor's name did not begin until the 1908 Olympics.  At the time, the IOC retroactively added a nationality alongside the names of previous performers, and that is how Orton became known as an American.  Next to his name in the record books it read "George Orton–U.S.A."  The mistake would go unnoticed for over 70 years before the IOC transferred those medal records from the U.S tally to Canada's medal total.  Orton is also the first athlete with a disability to win an Olympic gold medal.  For many years, he managed to hide his disability, the "dead" right arm and hand, permanently damaged in his childhood accident.

Father of Philadelphia Hockey
Orton was known as "The Father of Philadelphia Hockey".   He introduced ice hockey to Philadelphians in 1896 while at Penn, and captained the first team there.  Citing a lack of a proper facility, Orton was responsible for the building of the first indoor ice arena in Philadelphia, and the popularity of the sport took off from there.   Orton founded the Philadelphia Hockey League in 1897,  and the following year formed the Quaker City Hockey Club which played in the highly-competitive American Amateur Hockey League. From 1920 to 1922, Orton coached the Penn Varsity hockey team.  Years earlier, while attending the University of Toronto, he helped form the first hockey team there, and also played soccer for the 'Varsity' team in the Toronto Football League.  Orton was chosen to play on Canada's team that played against a U.S. all-star team from Fall River, Mass. on June 14, 1891.  In 1910 he played centre half for the Philadelphia all-stars against the New York all-stars In Haverford, Pennsylvania, and in 1923, at the age of fifty, he was playing soccer for Merchantville in the Philadelphia league.  He was a member of the Merion and Belmont Cricket Clubs of Philadelphia, the New York Athletic Club, the Pennsylvania Athletic Club, the University of Pennsylvania Track Club and was the secretary of the Rose Tree Fox Hunting Club of Media, Pa. for forty-three years.  Orton was also a member of the American Academy of Poets, and spoke nine languages fluently.

Track coach
Orton took part in the first Penn Relay Carnival in 1895, and later became the track coach at Penn, taking over after the death of Mike Murphy.  He wrote the definitive training manual for runners, "Distance and Cross Country Running" in 1903, and also wrote a book about the history of Penn Athletics.  He was the manager of the Penn Relays from 1919 to 1925, and helped nurture the event in its early years, making it the greatest annual track and field competition in the world.   He was inducted into Canada's Sports Hall of Fame and the Canadian Olympic Hall of Fame, as well as the University of Pennsylvania Hall of Fame and the Philadelphia Sports Hall of Fame.   His other books included the Bob Hunt series aimed at young men or boys who enjoy the outdoors.  In 1903, Orton co-founded Camp Tecumseh, in Meredith, New Hampshire.  A decade later, he founded Camp Iroquois, the first overnight athletic camp for girls and young women.

Orton was competitive in soccer (football) and became a writer on sports and running.  In 1911 Orton teamed up with Thomas Cahill to write a guide to association football, or soccer.

Orton was secretary of the Rose Tree Hunt Club.

Death and Legacy 

Orton was named to the Helm Foundation and University of Pennsylvania Hall of Fame. 

He died on June 24, 1958, in Laconia, New Hampshire, at age 85.

A book about Orton, The Greatest Athlete (you've never heard of), was published in 2019.

College Head Coaching Record

† Orton had requested that he be replaced prior to the season but agreed to remain with the program until a replacement was found.

References

External links 

1873 births
1958 deaths
Athletes (track and field) at the 1900 Summer Olympics
Canadian male hurdlers
Canadian male middle-distance runners
Olympic track and field athletes of Canada
Olympic bronze medalists for Canada
Olympic gold medalists for Canada
Track and field athletes from Ontario
People from Strathroy-Caradoc
University of Pennsylvania alumni
University of Toronto alumni
Canadian soccer players
Soccer people from Ontario
Canadian male steeplechase runners
Medalists at the 1900 Summer Olympics
University of Pennsylvania staff
Olympic gold medalists in athletics (track and field)
Olympic bronze medalists in athletics (track and field)
People from Meredith, New Hampshire
Association footballers not categorized by position
Penn Quakers men's ice hockey coaches
Canadian expatriates in the United States